Alexandar John Richardson (born 30 April 1990) is a British cyclist, who currently rides for UCI Continental team .

A former shipbroker, Richardson began cycling during mid-2015, and took a surprise solo win in the 2018 Lincoln Grand Prix, a couple of weeks after leaving the  team. In 2019, Richardson rejoined the  team he had competed for in 2017, and won the Arno Wallaard Memorial and a stage of the Tour de la Mirabelle. For 2020, he joined the  team.

In October 2021 Richardson was subjected to an armed robbery. He was training in Richmond Park when he was set upon by motorcyclists with a machete who stole his bike.

Major results
2018
 1st Lincoln Grand Prix
2019
 1st Arno Wallaard Memorial
 1st Stage 3 Tour de la Mirabelle
 6th Ronde van Overijssel
2021
 4th National Marathon Championships
2022
 1st Grand Prix de la ville de Nogent-sur-Oise 
 3rd Road race, National Road Championships

References

External links

1990 births
Living people
English male cyclists